Bradley Phillips (April 2, 1818 – November 15, 1904) was a minister of the Presbyterian Church in the United States of America and a member of the Wisconsin State Assembly.

Biography
Phillips was born on April 2, 1818 in Jefferson County, New York. Locations he settled in include Horicon, Wisconsin and Chippewa Falls, Wisconsin. He died at his son's home in Minneapolis on November 15, 1904 and was buried at Lakewood Cemetery in Minneapolis.

Assembly career
Phillips was a member of the Wisconsin Assembly during the 1872 session. He was a Republican.

References

External links

People from Jefferson County, New York
People from Horicon, Wisconsin
Politicians from Chippewa Falls, Wisconsin
Politicians from Eau Claire, Wisconsin
Presbyterian Church in the United States of America ministers
19th-century Presbyterian ministers
Religious leaders from Wisconsin
Republican Party members of the Wisconsin State Assembly
Princeton Theological Seminary alumni
Union College (New York) alumni
1818 births
1904 deaths
Burials at Lakewood Cemetery
19th-century American politicians
19th-century American clergy